Kimberly Ann Bergalis (January 19, 1968 – December 8, 1991) was an American woman who was one of six patients purportedly infected with HIV by dentist David J. Acer, who was infected with HIV and died of AIDS in September 1990. This incident is the first known case of clinical transmission of HIV.

Background
The eldest of three daughters, Bergalis was born in Tamaqua, Pennsylvania, in 1968, where her family lived until moving to Florida in 1978. In 1985, she enrolled at the University of Florida and majored in business.

In December 1987, dentist Dr. David Acer removed two of Bergalis's molars. Acer was HIV-positive at the time, having been diagnosed that fall. In March 1989, Bergalis began to display symptoms of AIDS and was diagnosed with the disease in January 1990. The initial report from the Centers for Disease Control and Prevention (CDC)  stated that she had likely acquired her infection from her dentist, which prompted Acer to write an open letter requesting that his patients be tested for HIV infection. The Florida Department of Health and Rehabilitative Services tested over 1,000 patients, discovering two additional HIV-positive patients.  The CDC would eventually identify a total of ten HIV-positive patients and subsequently retraced six of the infections to Acer.

CDC investigation
The CDC conducted a phylogenetic analysis of the DNA sequences of the viral envelope gene.  The analysis revealed that the viral sequences from five patients, including Bergalis, were more closely related to the dentist's viral sequences than to those from local controls.  Later analyses identified another HIV-positive patient with a viral sequence closely related to Acer's.  Independent review of the CDC tests strengthened the case that Bergalis' HIV infection was linked to Acer.

The time between Bergalis' dental procedure and the development of AIDS (24 months) was short; 1% of infected homosexual/bisexual men and 5% of infected transfusion recipients develop AIDS within two years of infection.

Political reaction
During the last months of her life, Bergalis' case was cited by some politicians and journalists as an example of a 'blameless' HIV infection that had been allowed to happen due to the CDC and the healthcare industry being overly responsive to the concerns of AIDS activists and the gay community. In an obituary, the National Review wrote that Bergalis:

came to feel she had a special calling...to bring a glimmer of truth, however forlorn, into a debate characterized by confusion, denial, smugness, and suicidal self-indulgence... 'No sexual history' is how the jaded describe a chaste woman of 23 who, as Miss Bergalis explained to disbelieving interviewers, 'wanted to wait for marriage.' Marriage and its joys will never come for Kimberly Bergalis, but in her integrity and courage she affirmed that other things were also precious.

Bergalis actively participated in several actions by congressmen to pass legislation restricting the activities of persons infected with HIV. Shortly before Bergalis's 1991 death, despite failing health, she testified before the Congress in support of a bill sponsored by Representative William Dannemeyer mandating HIV tests for healthcare workers, and permitting doctors to test patients without their consent.

Death and posthumous controversy
On December 8, 1991, Bergalis died of AIDS-related complications at her home in Fort Pierce, Florida. Her funeral was held on December 12 in her hometown of Tamaqua, Pennsylvania, after which she was buried in Saints Peter and Paul RC Lithuanian Cemetery.
Shortly after Bergalis’ death, a small park on Hutchinson Island South, Florida, was renamed Kimberly Bergalis Memorial Park in her memory.

Nearly three years after Bergalis’ death, in June 1994, CBS aired an episode of 60 Minutes that included a segment covering Acer and the patients he allegedly infected. The episode alleged that Bergalis, who said she was a virgin, had been treated for genital warts, a sexually transmitted disease, and showed her on videotape allegedly claiming to have had sex with two different men during her life. However, none of Bergalis' former serious boyfriends tested positive for HIV. In addition, the 60 Minutes anchors argued that the CDC may have botched the genetic tests that proved that Bergalis had the same strain of HIV as her dentist. The television broadcast was dismissed by CDC scientists as misleading and inaccurate.  Stephen Barr, a journalist who contributed to the show, rebutted this dismissal.

In 1990, Congressman Ted Weiss, who was skeptical of the CDC's conclusions, requested a formal investigation by the GAO, an independent federal research arm not beholden to the CDC. A GAO technical team thoroughly reviewed the CDC's actions and studied its evidence and conclusions. Their report fully supported the CDC report and refuted the claims of Barr and other skeptics, point by point. The principal investigator of the GAO team, Mark Rom, Ph.D., later published an analysis of the case. Neither the CDC nor the GAO was able to solve the mystery of just how Bergalis acquired the HIV virus from Acer, but neither agency doubts that this did happen somehow.

References

External links
 

1968 births
1991 deaths
AIDS-related deaths in Florida
Burials in Pennsylvania
HIV/AIDS activists
People from Fort Pierce, Florida
People from Tamaqua, Pennsylvania
University of Florida alumni